The 1991 World Judo Championships were the 17th edition of the World Judo Championships, and were held in Barcelona, Spain from July 25 to July 28, 1991.

Medal overview

Men

Women

Medal table

External links
Videos of championshipfights on de.video.search.yahoo.com
Results on www.judoinside.com

W
J
World Judo Championships
J